Pantai Remis is a state constituency in Perak, Malaysia, that has been represented in the Perak State Legislative Assembly.

Demographics

History

Polling districts
According to the federal gazette issued on 31 October 2022, the Pantai Remis constituency is divided into 16 polling districts.

Representative history

Election results

References

External links

Perak state constituencies